The rule consciousness as one of the primary factors of personality out of sixteen as categorized by Raymond Cattell, 1946 as low and high level. The descriptors of low level rule consciousness are expedient, nonconforming, disregards rules, self-indulgent or having a low super ego strength while the high level consciousness are rule-conscious, dutiful, conscientious, conforming, moralistic, staid, rule bound or having high super ego strength.

A theory also associates rule consciousness as the "original apperception", which is a Kantian concept of a mental state in which we perceive special kinds of non-spatial inner objects. Jean Piaget also studied rule consciousness between boys and girls in the context of games.

References

Personality